Omiodes monogona, the Hawaiian bean leafroller, is a moth of the family Crambidae. It is endemic to the Hawaiian islands of Kauai, Oahu, Molokai, Maui, Lanai and Hawaii. It was first cited as possibly extinct by the U.S. Fish & Wildlife Service in 1994. It was listed as extinct by the Hawaiʻi Biological Survey in 2002, but was rediscovered later in 2003.

The larvae feed on Canavalia galeata, Dolichos lablab, Erythrina monosperma, garden bean, Mucuna gigantea and Strongylodon lucidum. They feed beneath a turned over portion of a leaf of their host plant or between leaves that are in close contact, which they web together. Then they feed on the leaf substance leaving only the outer epidermis. The larvae are about 22 mm long and dark green.

Pupation takes place in the larval shelter. The pupa is about 9 mm long and medium brown. The pupal period lasts 11–13 days.

External links

Rediscovery of five species of Omiodes Guenée (Lepidoptera: Crambidae) on Hawaiʻi Island

Moths described in 1888
Endemic moths of Hawaii
meyricki